The men's 50 metre rifle three positions team competition at the 2014 Asian Games in Incheon, South Korea was held on 27 September at the Ongnyeon International Shooting Range.

The men's 50 metre rifle three positions consists of the prone, standing and kneeling positions, fired in that order, with 3×40 shots for men's competition.

The men's match has separate commands and times for each position, giving each shooter 45 minutes to complete the prone part, 75 minutes for the standing part, and 60 minutes for the kneeling part, including sighting shots for each part of the competition in this rifle three positions event.

The top eight competitors reach the final, where the score zones are divided into tenths, giving up to 10.9 points for each shot but qualification results are counted for the team event.

Twelve teams participated in this event. China won the Asian Games team title of this men's 50m rifle three positions event. The Chinese trio of Cao Yifei, Kang Hongwei and Zhu Qinan, collected a combined total of 3502 points. South Korea finished second to win the silver medal and Japan won the bronze medal after finishing in third position. India and Kazakhstan finished in 4th and 5th positions in order.

Schedule
All times are Korea Standard Time (UTC+09:00)

Records

Results

References

ISSF Results Overview

External links
Official website

Men Rifle 50 3P